Valsinni is a village and comune in the province of Matera, in the Basilicata region of southern Italy.

The village is bordered by Colobraro, Nocara, Noepoli, Nova Siri, Rotondella and San Giorgio Lucano.

History

The territory of the "comune" includes the ruins of the ancient city of Lagaria.

The town was known as  Favale San Cataldo until 1873.

Main sights

Sights include:
the Castle, dating back to the 11th century, where the Italian Renaissance poet Isabella Morra was born, lived and died
Palazzo Melidoro
Mother Church, of medieval origins, dedicated to Santa Maria Assunta
Church of the Annunciation (17th century)

Economy
The town has an ancient tradition of millers, whose symbol is the mill of Palazzo Mauri, which is still supplied with large stone wheels.
The economy of the town is mostly based on agriculture and livestock breeding.

Culture
The main festival of Valsinni occurs on 9/10 May, including a religious procession for the patron Saint Fabian. Another event is L'estate di Isabella ("Isabella's Summer"), held every summer in the month of August to honor Renaissance poet Isabella Morra.

People
Isabella Morra, the 16th century writer and poet, came from Valsinni, at the time known as Favale .

References

Cities and towns in Basilicata